Vlekete or Verekete is a deity and goddess of the sea in the mythology of the people of Badagry. Velekete has a shrine named after it called the Velekete Shrine and a slave market called Velekete Slave Market.

References

Yoruba goddesses
Sea and river goddesses